Jadson de Brito Lima (born 22 August 1991), simply known as Jadson, is a Brazilian footballer who plays for Portuguesa as a midfielder.

Career
Jadson de Brito Lima, arrived at the basic categories of Corinthians in 2006. The player participated in the successful campaign of the junior team during the Copa São Paulo de 2009. The midfielder rose to the professional team for Mano Menezes at the end of May 2009.

Career statistics
(Correct )

See also
Football in Brazil
List of football clubs in Brazil

References

External links

1991 births
Living people
Sportspeople from Salvador, Bahia
Brazilian footballers
Association football midfielders
Campeonato Brasileiro Série A players
Campeonato Brasileiro Série B players
Sport Club Corinthians Paulista players
Associação Desportiva Recreativa e Cultural Icasa players
Comercial Futebol Clube (Ribeirão Preto) players
Barretos Esporte Clube players
Atlético Monte Azul players
Clube Atlético Votuporanguense players
Mirassol Futebol Clube players
Associação Desportiva Cabofriense players
Nacional Atlético Clube (SP) players
São Carlos Futebol Clube players
Associação Portuguesa de Desportos players